Beware of Women is a 1933 British comedy film directed by George King and starring Jack Hobbs, Pat Paterson and Anthony Hankey. It was made at Teddington Studios as a quota quickie by Warner Brothers.

Cast
 Jack Hobbs as Andrew  
 Pat Paterson as Margery  
 Anthony Hankey as Tony  
 Clifford Heatherley as Lord Edeley  
 Helen Ferrers as Lady Edeley

References

Bibliography
 Chibnall, Steve. Quota Quickies: The Birth of the British 'B' Film. British Film Institute, 2007.

External links

1933 films
British comedy films
1933 comedy films
Films shot at Teddington Studios
Films directed by George King
Warner Bros. films
Quota quickies
Films set in England
British black-and-white films
1930s English-language films
1930s British films